Hiltonia is a city in Screven County, Georgia, United States. The population was 421 at the 2000 census.

Geography

Demographics

As of the census of 2000, there were 421 people, 134 households, and 101 families residing in the city. The racial makeup of the city was 69.83% African American, 28.98% White,  0.24% Native American, 0.71% Asian, and 0.24% from two or more races.

There were 134 households, out of which 35.1% had children under the age of 18 living with them, 41.8% were married couples living together, 26.9% had a female householder with no husband present, and 24.6% were non-families. 19.4% of all households were made up of individuals, and 7.5% had someone living alone who was 65 years of age or older.  The average household size was 3.14 and the average family size was 3.63.

In the city, the population was spread out, with 33.5% under the age of 18, 11.2% from 18 to 24, 22.8% from 25 to 44, 22.3% from 45 to 64, and 10.2% who were 65 years of age or older.  The median age was 30 years. For every 100 females, there were 92.2 males.  For every 100 females age 18 and over, there were 84.2 males.

The median income for a household in the city was $14,464, and the median income for a family was $16,667. Males had a median income of $18,125 versus $12,308 for females. The per capita income for the city was $6,845.  About 48.0% of families and 49.1% of the population were below the poverty line, including 52.3% of those under age 18 and 37.9% of those age 65 or over.

References

http://www.city-data.com/city/Hiltonia-Georgia.html

Cities in Georgia (U.S. state)
Cities in Screven County, Georgia